Florence Mars (January 1, 1923 – April 23, 2006) was an American civil rights activist and author best known for her book Witness in Philadelphia about the murder of three civil rights activists in Mississippi.

Civil rights activities
Mars was one of the few whites in Neshoba County, Mississippi who supported the Civil Rights Movement. She helped to register black voters. Mars lived in Philadelphia, Mississippi when three civil rights activists James Chaney, Michael Schwerner and Andrew Goodman were beaten and shot by members of the Ku Klux Klan near Philadelphia.

She was one of the few inhabitants to co-operate with the Federal Bureau of Investigation. Edgar Ray Killen and others faced trial for violating the civil rights of the men in 1967 but the jury was deadlocked. Seven men were convicted in relation to the incident but no-one served more than six years. This incident was later the subject of the film Mississippi Burning, which was released in 1988. Frances McDormand's character was partly based on Mars. Mars' activities led to the Ku Klux Klan burning down her barn in an effort to intimidate her.

Witness in Philadelphia
In 1977, she published Witness in Philadelphia: a Mississippi WASP's Account of Civil Rights Murders which told of her activities in the civil rights movement and the murder of the three activists. This book helped to keep interest alive in the murders with the success of Mississippi Burning making many more people aware of the incident. As a result of this incident, Killen was sentenced to sixty years in prison on June 1, 2005.

Death
Mars died in Philadelphia, Mississippi, aged 83, of Bell's palsy and diabetes from which she had been suffering.

References

 Witness in Philadelphia by Florence Mars.  Louisiana State University Press, 1977;

External links

1923 births
2006 deaths
Activists for African-American civil rights
People from Philadelphia, Mississippi
Writers from Mississippi